Gim Heum-sun (김흠순, born 599), also known as Kim Heum-sun, was a general in 7th-century Silla. He is said to have been the great-grandchild of King Guhae of Geumgwan Gaya, the last ruler of the Geumgwan Gaya state. This would have given him a very high position in Silla's bone rank system, which governed the political and military status that a person could attain. His elder brother, Gim Yu-sin, was known as one of the great general of Korean history, and he led the unification of the Korean peninsula.

Popular culture
 Portrayed by Park Jae-woong in the 2012-2013 KBS1 TV series Dream of the Emperor.

Military history of Korea
Silla people
Silla Buddhists
Korean generals
Gimhae Kim clan
People from Gyeongju
599 births
Year of death unknown